, known by the stage name Akira, is a Japanese actor and dancer. He is also a member of the all-male J-Pop groups Exile and Exile The Second.

Participating Groups

Life and career
Akira was born in Yokohama, Kanagawa Prefecture, Japan. He moved to Iwata, Shizuoka, at the age of three.

Akira started dancing at the age of 16, at dance club events around the Shizuoka area. He then moved to Tokyo and went on to find the talent agency Makidai & USA. In December 2004, he debuted as a performer in Rather Unique. In June 2006, he joined the group Exile as a performer.

He began working as an actor in March 2006, appearing in the "No.1 Attack" stage troupe Gumi Honan. Since then, he has acted in a number of TV dramas in Japan, including the 2012 remake of the Great Teacher Onizuka series, which has been broadcast on Fuji TV since July 2012.

In 2015, Akira provided the voice of Mad Max in the Japanese dub of the film Mad Max: Fury Road.

In September 2016, was announced that he was joining the group Exile The Second as a performer.

In June 2019, he announced that he will marry Lin Chi-ling, a Taiwanese supermodel and actress. Lin gave birth to a son on 31 January 2022.

Works

TV Drama
 Around 40 - Chuumon no Ooi Onnatachi (TBS, April 2008-), role of Tatsuya Ogata 
 Toomawari no Ame (NTV, 2010-Mar-27 start), role of Yasushi Kikuchi 
 Tumbling (TBS, 2010-Apr-17 start), role of Yutaka Kashiwagi 
 Gou - Himetachi no sengoku (NHK, 2011-Jan-09 to 2011-Nov-27), role of Hidekatsu Toyotomi 
 GTO (Fuji TV, July 2012 - September 2012), role of Eikichi Onizuka
 Biblia Koshodō no Jiken Techō (Fuji TV, January 2013 - March 2013), role of Daisuke Goura 
 Honey Trap (Fuji TV, October 2013 - December 2013), role of Yuuichi Miyama 
 GTO (2nd season) (Fuji TV, July 2014 - September 2014), role of Eikichi Onizuka
 HEAT (Fuji TV, July 2015 - September 2015), role of Tatsuya Ikegami
 High & Low - The Story of S.W.O.R.D. (NTV, October 2015 - December 2015), role of Kohaku
 High & Low - The Story of S.W.O.R.D. (2nd season) (NTV, April 2016 - June 2016), role of Kohaku

Film
 Hana Yori Dango Final (2008), Sunny
 Yamagata Scream (2009), Santaro
 Properly convey (2009), North Shiro
 Legend of the Fist：The Return of Chen Zhen (2010), Sasaki
 Hanjiro (2010), Yaichiro Nagayama
 Working Holiday (2012), Yamato Okita
 Kusahara no Isu (2013), Kagiyama
 Unfair: the end (2015), 
 High & Low: The Movie (2016), Kohaku
 High&Low The Red Rain (2016), Kohaku
 High&Low The Movie 2 / End of Sky (2017), Kohaku
 High&Low The Movie 3 / Final Mission (2017), Kohaku
 Tatara Samurai (2017)
 This Old Road: Konomichi (2019), Kosaku Yamada
 The Pass: Last Days of the Samurai (2022), Yamamoto Tatewaki

Short film 

 Cinema Fighters "Kimochirabo no Kaihō"(2018)
 Cinema Fighters Project "Beautiful" (2019)

TV Show
 Exile Generation (NTV, January 2009 - March 2010)
 EXH: Exile House (TBS, April 2009 - March 2010)
 Hiruxile (NTV, April 2010 - March 2011)
 EXE (TBS, April 2010 - September)
 Exile Tamashii (MBS TV MBS, TBS, October 2010)

Radio
 Sessions Four (FM North Wave)
 Radio Mashup MASHUP (Yokohama FM radio, October 2010 -)

References

1981 births
Living people
Japanese male dancers
Japanese male film actors
Japanese male television actors
21st-century Japanese male actors
Male actors from Yokohama
LDH (company) artists